Canta En Italiano is a 1965 EP by Gene Pitney. The EP contains four tracks taken from the Gene Italiano LP.

Tracklisting
Amici Miei  	2:55
E Cuando Viene La Notte  	2:49
Saro Forte  	2:14
I Tuoi Anni Piu Belli  	3:07

References

1965 EPs